= Seda Babel =

Iraqi newspaper

- Type: Newspaper
- Publisher: Da’ud Sliwa
- Editor: Yusuf Ghanimah
- Founded: 1909
- Language: Arabic
- Headquarters: Baghdad

Seda Babel or Echo of Babylon was a newspaper published in Baghdad. It was owned by Chaldean Catholic Church Assyrians but was secular in outlook.
